Alton is a city and the county seat of Oregon County, Missouri, United States. The population was 707 at the 2020 census.

History
Alton was platted in 1859.  The city was named after Alton, Illinois. A post office has been in operation in Alton since 1860. Alton was incorporated as a city in 1929.

Greer Mill was listed on the National Register of Historic Places in 2005.

Geography
Alton is located at  (36.693920, -91.399076).

Climate

Demographics

2010 census
As of the census of 2010, there were 871 people, 352 households, and 213 families living in the city. The racial makeup of the city was 95.64% White, 0.46% Black or African American, 0.69% Native American, and 3.21% from two or more races. Hispanic or Latino people of any race were 1.38% of the population.

There were 352 households, of which 32.7% had children under the age of 18 living with them, 39.8% were married couples living together, 16.2% had a female householder with no husband present, 4.5% had a male householder with no wife present, and 39.5% were non-families. 35.5% of all households were made up of individuals, and 23% had someone living alone who was 65 years of age or older. The average household size was 2.34 and the average family size was 2.99.

The median age in the city was 39.2 years. 28.7% of residents were under the age of 18; 6.3% were between the ages of 18 and 24; 22.2% were from 25 to 44; 16.9% were from 45 to 64; and 25.6% were 65 years of age or older. The gender makeup of the city was 45.7% male and 54.3% female.

2000 census
As of the census of 2000, there were 668 people, 321 households, and 188 families living in the city. The population density was 797.2 people per square mile (307.0/km2). There were 364 housing units at an average density of 434.4 per square mile (167.3/km2). The racial makeup of the city was 97.01% White, 0.30% African American, 1.95% Native American, and 0.75% from two or more races. Hispanic or Latino people of any race were 0.60% of the population.

There were 321 households, out of which 24.0% had children under the age of 18 living with them, 45.2% were married couples living together, 11.2% had a female householder with no husband present, and 41.4% were non-families. 38.6% of all households were made up of individuals, and 26.8% had someone living alone who was 65 years of age or older. The average household size was 2.07 and the average family size was 2.70.

In the city, the population was spread out, with 20.1% under the age of 18, 7.3% from 18 to 24, 23.2% from 25 to 44, 22.3% from 45 to 64, and 27.1% who were 65 years of age or older. The median age was 45 years. For every 100 females there were 82.5 males. For every 100 females age 18 and over, there were 78.6 males.

The median income for a household in the city was $16,667, and the median income for a family was $21,667. Males had a median income of $21,184 versus $13,929 for females. The per capita income for the city was $10,071. About 18.0% of families and 27.4% of the population were below the poverty line, including 28.1% of those under age 18 and 33.6% of those age 65 or over.

Education
Alton R-IV School District operates Alton Elementary School and Alton High School.

The town has a lending library, the Alton Branch Library.

See also

 Irish Wilderness

References

External links
 
 Historic maps of Alton in the Sanborn Maps of Missouri Collection at the University of Missouri

Cities in Missouri
Cities in Oregon County, Missouri
County seats in Missouri